The Johnny Sack Cabin, at Big Springs, Idaho near Island Park, is a log bungalow built in 1932–34.  It was listed on the National Register of Historic Places in 1979.

It was built by German immigrant carpenter Johnny Sack, but its design seems from then-modern bungalow style, rather than from German origins.

References

Log buildings and structures
National Register of Historic Places in Fremont County, Idaho
Buildings and structures completed in 1934
German-American culture in Idaho
1934 establishments in Idaho